Canton Eloy Alfaro is a canton of Ecuador, part of the province of Esmeraldas.  Its capital is the town of Limones.  Its population at the 2001 census was 33,403.

Demographics
Ethnic groups as of the Ecuadorian census of 2010:
Afro-Ecuadorian  64.1%
Indigenous  16.8%
Mestizo  14.6%
White  3.4%
Montubio  1.0%
Other  0.2%

References

Cantons of Esmeraldas Province